Drake Doremus (born March 29, 1983) is an American film director, screenwriter and producer best known for directing the films Like Crazy (2011), which won the Grand Jury Prize at the 2011 Sundance Film Festival, Douchebag (2010) which was in Dramatic competition at the 2010 Sundance Film Festival, and Equals (2015).

Career 
Doremus studied directing at the AFI Conservatory, being the youngest fellow ever accepted into the film school. Doremus' mother, Cherie Kerr, was a founding member of the legendary L.A. The Groundlings. Doremus grew up on Kerr's stage, performing with the Orange County Crazies, starting at the age of six as an improv comedy player. He went on to produce and direct for that organization, including his own original works. At the recommendation of a talent agent in 2008, Doremus was introduced to producer Jonathan Schwartz, who would produce his subsequent four films.

His 2011 film Like Crazy has been described as loosely inspired by his real life experiences. It stars Anton Yelchin, Felicity Jones, and Jennifer Lawrence. Most of the dialogue in the film was improvised, with only a 50-page detailed outline as a script. The film was shot in a month on only a $250,000 budget, and won the Grand Jury Prize at the 2011 Sundance Film Festival.

In 2012, Doremus directed a six-part social film for Intel and Toshiba called The Beauty Inside. It was written by Richard Greenberg, and stars Mary Elizabeth Winstead and Topher Grace. The series earned him a Daytime Emmy for Outstanding New Approaches - Original Daytime Program or Series. In June 2013, his film Breathe In starring Felicity Jones, Guy Pearce, Amy Ryan, and Mackenzie Davis opened the Edinburgh International Film Festival EIFF. Doremus directed the 2015 science-fiction romantic drama film Equals, written by Nathan Parker based on a story by Doremus and starring Kristen Stewart, Nicholas Hoult, Guy Pearce, and Jacki Weaver.

In 2017, Doremus directed and produced the romantic drama Newness, which had its world premiere at the Sundance Film Festival. The film reunites Doremus with Nicholas Hoult, who starred in his previous film Equals. It also stars Laia Costa. He again forayed into science-fiction romance with Zoe, written by Richard Greenberg and released by Amazon Studios on July 20, 2018. It stars Léa Seydoux, Ewan McGregor, Theo James, Rashida Jones, Matthew Gray Gubler, Miranda Otto, and Christina Aguilera. Doremus directed the advertisement for Hugo Boss' "The Scent Private Accord" perfume, starring Jamie Dornan.

Doremus frequently collaborates with Ben York Jones, who co-wrote Like Crazy and Breathe In with Doremus, and wrote Newness. York Jones produced Douchebag and Newness, and appeared as an actor in Spooner, Douchebag, Like Crazy, and The Beauty Inside. In addition, he received special thanks on Equals.

Future work 
It was announced that Doremus is teaming with Amazon to co-executive produce and direct a television series based on Jardine Libaire's book White Fur. Doremus is set to direct another romantic drama entitled Aurora, produced by CJ Entertainment. It was also announced that Doremus has signed a two-year deal with Paramount Television to develop new projects and direct existing projects.

Personal life 
Doremus' film Like Crazy was inspired by his own long-distance relationship and marriage. In an interview with IndieWire, he said:
I'm a divorcee. I got married to this woman to try and get her back, I went through the visa stuff, to try and get her back in the States... I'd spent so much time here, visiting someone when I was in a long-distance relationship, so I was so familiar with what it feels like to be jet-lagged, and only be here for 5 days, and try to be romantic, and try to fit in the love, and try to relive what we were going through, while taking in a new city, and being nine hours ahead. That relationship was from 2001 to 2008. she was in the US from 2001-2004, so from 04-08 it was back and forth, four years of long distance.

Filmography

Feature films

Music videos

Awards and nominations

References

External links 
 

1983 births
AFI Conservatory alumni
American male screenwriters
Living people
People from Orange, California
Film directors from California
Screenwriters from California